Krumen is a dialect continuum spoken by the Krumen people of Liberia and Ivory Coast (Tabou and Grabo subprefectures). It is a branch of the Grebo languages, a subfamily of the Kru languages and ultimately of the Niger–Congo languages. It had 48,300 speakers in 1993. The main varieties are:

Tepo: Tepo, Bapo, Wlopo / Ropo, Dapo, Honpo, Yrepo / Kapo, Glawlo dialects
Pye: Trepo, Wluwe-Hawlo, Gbowe-Hran, Wlepo, Dugbo, Yrewe / Giriwe / Jrwe [ɟʀwe] / Jrewe, Yapo, Pie dialects
Plapo
Plapo has only a hundred speakers and no dialectal variation.

See also 
 Kru Pidgin English

References

Grebo languages
Languages of Liberia
Languages of Ivory Coast